Cambodian names (or Khmer names) are names used or originating in Cambodia which usually consist of two elements including a patronymic, which serves as a common family name for siblings, followed by a given name (i.e. following the Eastern name order). An example is singer Sinn Sisamouth, his surname (last name) is Sinn and his given name (first name) is Sisamouth (in Western sources, the two are sometimes reversed). 

The use of surnames in Cambodia is relatively recent and was not mandated by law until imposed by the French in 1910. Surnames are typically derived from the father's given name.

Other Austroasiatic indigenous people groups within Cambodia have similar naming customs, while the Sino-Khmer and Viet-Khmer may follow Chinese and Vietnamese naming patterns, respectively. Chams in Cambodia may have either Khmer or Cham names or a combination of both. Cham name order is the reverse of the Khmer; the given name is followed by the father's given name.

Given names
Generally, women are given names relating to beauty, while men are given names of virtues. Some Khmer given names are unisex names.

Surnames
Historically, Khmer practiced cognatic kinship and reckoned descent bilaterally, and surnames were not used to trace descent. Surnames became mandatory only by legal decree during the French colonial era in 1910, but was rarely used outside of legal and administrative matters. After the passage of the law, parents often gave their children the father, grandfather or great-grandfather's given name as a surname. Some Khmer may also have surnames from the mother or two given names with one used as a surname. This heterogeneous naming practice continued into the 1970s and 1980s. When they were used, they were usually taken from the father's given name and are generally monosyllabic. Khmer surnames are sometimes identical to Chinese or Vietnamese surnames. Women keep their maiden names after marriage.

Origin and meanings
The earliest attested names among Khmer either have indigenous origins or were drawn from Sanskrit. The use of Sanskrit and Indic words as names continues to the present.

The meanings of Khmer names are generally very simple and reference positive attributes.  Cambodian people are called by their given names without a title (informal) or by their given names with a title (formal); the full name, including both family name and given name is often used (Surnames are used as a form of address, however, in the case of names that originated as revolutionary aliases).

Different naming traditions exist among ethnic groups other than the Khmer majority. The Cambodian population is 90% Buddhist and names are often taken from Buddhism. Among the Muslim minority, Arabic names are often used as family names.

Pronunciation
Khmer names are usually pronounced with the stress (emphasis) placed on the last syllable. In romanizations of Khmer script, aspiration (i.e., a breath sound) is usually marked with an h. Final r, d, g, s, b, and z sounds are not heard: Ngor is pronounced Ngow. Some final consonants are written but not pronounced.

List of some family names
Although historically, surnames were chosen from the father, grandfather, or great-grandfather's given name, in modern practice, surnames are now usually transmitted from father to children. Other ethnic groups, particularly Chinese-Cambodians and Vietnamese-Cambodians, may have a family name that is taken by each generation, in which case the name is pronounced similarly to the language of origin but within the bounds of Khmer phonology. Below is a list of some common family names, some of which are also found as given names.

List of given names
Unlike Khmer family names, given names may have multiple syllables and differ greatly. Given names were influenced greatly by Sanskrit.

Compound names
At times, many families combine shorter names to create a longer name. This happens often among the wealthier class of Cambodians.

Sovanna (Combined "So" and "Vanna") means gold in Sanskrit
Somally (Combined "So" and "Maly")
Chandarith (Combined "Chanda" and "Rith")

See also
 Khmer Names Asian name pronunciation guide

References

Names by culture
Cambodian culture